Isaba is a town and municipality located in the province and autonomous community of Navarre, northern Spain.
Is the main town of the Roncal valley and is sited in the Pyrenees of the autonomous Region.

References

External links
 ISABA in the Bernardo Estornés Lasa - Auñamendi Encyclopedia (Euskomedia Fundazioa) 

Municipalities in Navarre